The Hirschgarten, formally the Königlicher Hirschgarten, is a restaurant in Munich. The restaurant is noted for its beer garden. It has seating for over 8000 people.

The restaurant dates back to 1791.

References

External links

 The Hirschgarten's English home page

German beer culture
Restaurants in Germany
Food and drink companies based in Munich